"Dragon's Legend" is a song recorded by Italian group Koto. Released in 1988, it was their second and final single that charted, reaching No. 20 in the Netherlands. It contains samples from the 1983 video game Dragon's Lair. Later in the year, a remixed version called "Dragon's Megamix" was released.

References 

1988 singles
1988 songs
Koto (band) songs